Florian Niederlechner (born 24 October 1990) is a German professional footballer who plays as a forward for  club Hertha BSC.

Career
Niederlechner's career is considered atypical since he became a Bundesliga player without passing through the youth ranks of a professional club. At the age of twelve, after a single year with the club, he was forced to leave the under-13 team of 1860 Munich being deemed too small and too slow. He moved to the local Kreisliga club TSV Ebersberg, starting playing senior football for Landesliga side FC Falke Markt Schwaben in 2008. At the time he completed his vocational training as industrial management assistant.

In 2010, he joined fifth tier Bayernliga side FC Ismaning. There he created a stir by scoring 19 goals in the 2010–11 season, eventually receiving and accepting an offer from 3. Liga's SpVgg Unterhaching, which was  forced to bet on young talents due to its financial difficulties. For Unterhaching, Niederlechner continued to be a successful striker, scoring eight goals in the 2011–12 season and another eight in the first leg of the next campaign. During the winter break 2012–13, he made the next move, this time to ambitious fellow 3. Liga side 1. FC Heidenheim, with whom he achieved promotion to the 2. Bundesliga in 2014. After 15 goals and ten assists in 33 league matches, and Heidenheim finishing 8th after promotion to 2. Bundesliga, he finally made the step to the Bundesliga, joining Mainz 05. This move was reportedly worth a transfer fee of  €2 million.

He was loaned to SC Freiburg on 31 January 2016. 

On 29 May 2019, FC Augsburg announced that Niederlechner would join the club from the upcoming season. He penned a three-year contract.

On 18 January 2023, Niederlechner joined Hertha BSC on a contract valid until 2025. On 28 January 2023, Niederlechner made his Hertha debut as a substitute for Wilfried Kanga, against Union Berlin.

Personal life
He shares a flat with one of his best friends, Michael Vitzthum, who had been his team mate at Heidenheim, and now plays for SV Wehen Wiesbaden.

References

External links

1990 births
Living people
People from Ebersberg (district)
Sportspeople from Upper Bavaria
Footballers from Bavaria
German footballers
Association football forwards
SpVgg Unterhaching players
1. FC Heidenheim players
1. FSV Mainz 05 players
SC Freiburg players
FC Augsburg players
Hertha BSC players
Bundesliga players
2. Bundesliga players
3. Liga players